Gerdu Chub may refer to:
 Gerdu Chub, Sarduiyeh